Buford is an unincorporated community in Baxter County, Arkansas, United States.  It is the location of (or is the nearest community to) Buford School Building, which is located on AR 126 and is listed on the National Register of Historic Places.

References

Unincorporated communities in Baxter County, Arkansas
Unincorporated communities in Arkansas